Hawthorne was an electoral district of the Legislative Assembly in the Australian state of Queensland from 1960 to 1972.

It was established in the redistribution before the 1960 election from parts of the former district of Norman and the district of Bulimba.

It was abolished ahead of the 1972 election and its areas absorbed into surrounding districts, mostly Bulimba.

Members for Hawthorne

Election results

See also
 Electoral districts of Queensland
 Members of the Queensland Legislative Assembly by year
 :Category:Members of the Queensland Legislative Assembly by name

References 

Former electoral districts of Queensland
Constituencies established in 1960
1960 establishments in Australia
Constituencies disestablished in 1972
1972 disestablishments in Australia